Abraham Assefa (born 9 December 1972) is an Ethiopian long-distance runner. He competed in the men's 10,000 metres at the 1996 Summer Olympics.

References

External links
 

1972 births
Living people
Athletes (track and field) at the 1996 Summer Olympics
Ethiopian male long-distance runners
Olympic athletes of Ethiopia
Place of birth missing (living people)